The Royal Victorian Order is an order of knighthood awarded by the sovereign of the United Kingdom and several Commonwealth realms. It is granted personally by the monarch and recognises personal service to the monarchy, the Royal Household, royal family members, and the organisation of important royal events. The order was officially created and instituted on 23 April 1896 by letters patent under the Great Seal of the Realm by Queen Victoria. The order has had five grades since its institution, the two highest of which confer the status of knighthood on holders (apart from foreigners, who typically received honorary awards not entitling them to the style of a knight). Women were not admitted until Edward VIII altered the statutes of the order in 1936. The order has five statutory officers—Grand Master, Chancellor, Secretary, Registrar and Chaplain—as well as a non-statutory Honorary Genealogist.

The order has had a chancellor and a secretary since it was founded; the former office is held ex officio by the Lord Chamberlain of the Royal Household, while the office of secretary has been held ex officio by the Keeper of the Privy Purse (except for the years 1936 to 1943 when the King's Private Secretary was also the order's secretary). The order has had a registrar since 1916; the first appointee was the Secretary of the Private Secretary's Office, Sir Francis Morgan Bryant, while his two successors were Secretaries to the Privy Purse; since 1936, the Registrar has always been the Secretary of the Central Chancery of the Orders of Knighthood. On 1 February 1937, King George VI appointed his Queen, Elizabeth (later the Queen Mother) as the order's inaugural Grand Master; after her death in 2002, the office fell vacant until Elizabeth II appointed her daughter, Princess Anne, Princess Royal, Grand Master. The Savoy Chapel was made the order's chapel in 1938 and its chaplain has also been ex officio the order's chaplain ever since. Since 1938, the order has also had an Honorary Genealogist, who has also been an Officer of Arms, although appointees are not technically officers of the order, there being no provision for it in the statutes.

Grand Masters

Chancellors

Secretaries

Registrars

Chaplains

Honorary Genealogists

References

Citations

Bibliography 
 P. Duckers (2004), British Orders and Decorations (Princes Risborough: Shire Publications Ltd)
 P. Galloway, D. Stanley, D. Martin (1996), Royal Service, volume 1 (London: Victorian Publishing)
 C. McCreery (2008), On Her Majesty's Service: Royal Honours and Recognition in Canada (Toronto: Dundurn Press)
 W. M. Shaw (1906), The Knights of England, volume i (London: Sherratt and Hughes; OCLC 185192520)

British honours system
Royal Victorian Order